Paraguayo Cubas Colomes (born 8 January 1962) is a Paraguayan politician and media personality known for what some see as provocative publicity stunts. A lawyer, he served one term in Congress from 1993 to 1998 as a member of the center-left National Encounter Party. In 2018, Cubas was elected to the Senate as a sole member of the National Crusade Movement but was suspended for outbursts and physical altercations with Senate colleagues.

On the eve of the 2023 general election, Cubas with his party participated in the creation of the Concertación coalition, but soon left it before the election of a single opposition candidate, deciding to participate in the elections independently. In the 2023 elections, Paraguayo Cubas is considered an outsider or spoiler candidate for the Concertación. However, he has support among the anti-systemic electorate, advocating the death penalty for corruption.

References

1962 births
Living people
People from Washington, D.C.
Paraguayan people of Spanish descent
20th-century Paraguayan lawyers
Universidad Nacional de Asunción alumni